Rasel, popularly known as Master Rasel is a Bangladeshi film actor. He won the Bangladesh National Film Award for Best Child Artist for the film Rajlakshmi Srikanta (1987) which he shared with Suborna Shirin.

Notable films
 Rajlakshmi Srikanta - 1987
 Kashem Malar Prem - 1991
 Tiger - 1997

Awards

References

Bangladeshi film actors
Recipients of the National Film Awards (Bangladesh)
Living people
1979 births